Pepper&Carrot is a free and open source webcomic series by French artist David Revoy. It is also published by Glénat Editions.

The series consists of small episodes about teenage witch Pepper and her cat Carrot, and with stories without violence it aims to be accessible for everyone.

The free license permits the work to be remixed and reused, even for commercial purposes, which has led to derivative works such as animated short films, cosplay, fanart, a card game, a boardgame, several video games, and the work being used in research.

The webcomic is completely, or almost completely, translated into 27 different languages, and to an additional 36 languages with a lower degree of coverage.

Revoy creates the series entirely with free software, such as Krita and Inkscape, making the Krita source files for each image available for download.

Plot 
Pepper is a young orphan witch disciple at Chaosah, the smallest of the six schools of magic on the magical planet Hereva. She is aided by her cat Carrot, and lives with her mentors Thyme, Cayenne, and Cumin in a house in the forest of Squirrel's End. Her peers are Saffron, Shichimi, Coriander, and Camomile.

Humans and various humanoids live alongside dragons and other mystical animals. After years of war between the schools of magic, there is a grudging peace. Pepper navigates the vicissitudes of growing up in a changing world and works hard to find her own place in it, but does so with a sense of humor. But there are happenings between the nations elsewhere in Hereva that may put a wrench in her plans.

Revoy aims for each episode to contain a small story arc where a character evolves and learns. The story bible is available on the website.

List of episodes 

Since the first episode, around 0.356 episodes per month have been published (or 2.81 months between each episode). Episodes 6-24 were first drafted in French.

Funding

Revoy aims to change the comic book industry by eliminating intermediate steps in the production process. Though Pepper&Carrot is free, he encourages people to support him via crowdfunding in the form a small amount of money per episode that is released.

Patreon takes a commission of 5%, in addition to any credit card fees. This is significantly less than a traditional chain where the publisher, distributors and retailers each claim a part of the profit. People donating monthly some amount on Patreon to Pepper&Carrot – are named on the bottom of the comics.

In 2018, Pepper&Carrot was believed to be one of the more successful creative projects on Liberapay, a platform for recurrent donations. In February 2023, Revoy made €62.11 per week from 79 patrons and with the top public patron giving €8.23 per week. About starting an account on Liberapay despite already receiving funding via Patreon, Revoy said it provided "a stronger focus on privacy for the Pepper&Carrot audience" and offered lower transaction fees. Since 2022, also patrons on Liberapay can get their name in the credit written at the end of the webcomic.

Other methods of payment to support Revoy are Tipeee, PayPal, and wire transfer (which works worldwide and is free of charge within Europe)

Revoy suggests the business model allows the comic to stay independent and doesn't have to resort to advertising. On the webcomic's webpage he extensively explains his philosophy, the reasons for wanting to cut out intermediaries between artist and audience, and why he does not put any content behind a paywall.

When the publisher Glénat reached out to Revoy about publishing Pepper&Carrot, he declined their offer of a traditional contract with royalty payments in favor of keeping the Creative Commons attribution license, something that caused confusion in the legal and financial departments of the publisher. Glénat then offered to be the top patron of the webcomic, and Revoy retained the copyright and creative control over it. He considers Glénat's published books as just one of many other derivative works of the webcomic.

About working on the webcomic, Revoy said in 2015 that it was a dream come true and that "Every artist I know would love to make their own comics. Would love to get paid for making it, and to keep the control of it".

Origin and production 
David Revoy explained the origin of Pepper&Carrot and the world of Hereva in 2014:

He uses the iteration method to create new episodes:

Revoy aims for each episode to contain a small story arc where a character evolves and learns.

Reviews of the text in the speech balloons, and the translations, are performed in GitLab using Markdown.

Translations 
As of March 2023, the webcomic is translated into the following 27 languages with a coverage of 90 percent or higher:

 Catalan
 Chinese
 Danish
 German
 English
 Esperanto
 Spanish
 Finnish
 French
 Scottish Gaelic
 Galo
 Indonesian
 Italian
 Japanese
 Cornish
 Lithuanian
 Mexican Spanish
 Dutch language
 Norwegian (Nynorsk)
 Norwegian (Bokmål)
 Polish
 Portuguese
 Romanian
 Russian
 Slovene
 Toki Pona
 Vietnamese

For another 36 languages, the coverage is less than 90 percent.

The web page has an open invitation to contribute to translations, and detailed instructions on how to do it.

License and derivative works 

All artwork is made available under the Creative Commons Attribution 4.0 license (CC-BY). The free license permits the work to be remixed and reused, even for commercial purposes, which has led to derivative works such as animated short films, cosplay, fanart, a card game, a boardgame, several video games, and research.

Revoy often publishes links from his blog to derivative works and has expressed excitement that his work is re-used, saying "I'll never regret making Pepper&Carrot so open." and that he is happy to see other people making money from it.

He attributes some of the success of the webcomic to the release of its source, and highlighted the many translations into other languages.

In 2022, one derivative (a publication) had removed content (a panel) and added dialog to episodes that originally had no dialog. The publisher had been very honest to the audience about the changes by publishing preview files of the content of the books. Revoy saw it as a good opportunity to question his decision to choose a free license for his work, but in the end he affirmed his decision, concluded that it was part of publishing his work under such a free license, and also that part of the work of a publisher is to adapt the content to its audience. He hoped that the derivative publication would help that audience discover his original work. Revoy congratulated the publisher on their successful crowd-funding campaign and welcomed the financial support that the derivative work would bring to his own project of producing future episodes of the webcomic.

Publication 

In 2016 French publisher Glénat added a bundle with episodes 1 through 11 to their catalog, to print and distribute the comic in France. Revoy was consulted to ensure the colours and quality of the print are as he envisioned it. The publication has no effect on the license of the webcomic. In April 2017 the second volume of the book, including the episodes 12 to 21, was published by Glénat. There is also a printed version of the Bretonic version of the first ten episodes by publisher Ar Gripi, as well as a German printed version by publisher Popcom, and a Bulgarian version by Prikazka-Igra.

Animated films 

In 2016, the Morevna team started a crowdfunding campaign for a motion comic version of episode 6. The animation was done based on the original source files with free software like Krita, Blender, Papagayo-NG and RenderChan. The film was released in June 2017 under the Creative Commons Attribution 4.0 license. Revoy was not associated with the production, but appreciated the project.

Video games 

In 2021, Pepper was made a playable character in the free kart racing game SuperTuxKart 1.3.

There are at least four different video games based on Pepper&Carrot in development.

Board game 
Loyalist Games created a board game based on episode 6 of the comic. Just like the webcomic the game is available under a free license, and its rulebook has instructions in English, Dutch, French and Spanish.

References

External links

 

2010s webcomics
Anime and manga inspired webcomics
Comedy webcomics
Fantasy webcomics
Comics about cats
Comics about women
Creative Commons-licensed comics
2014 webcomic debuts